Prince Henry of the Netherlands may refer to:

Prince William Frederick Henry of the Netherlands (1820–1879), third son of King William II
Duke Henry of Mecklenburg-Schwerin (1876–1934), spouse of Queen Wilhelmina

See also
Prince Henry (disambiguation)